Marjorie van Vliet (Zeuch) (192315 June 1990) was a teacher from Warwick, Rhode Island in the United States, who, aged 55, learned to fly and decided to undertake projects to promote world peace and related causes through her flying.

Touring for peace 
After founding a "World Friendship Association" and flying some domestic flights to promote world peace and fight child abuse, van Vliet looked for further flying-related challenges. As a more ambitious goal, she decided to fly across the Atlantic Ocean to the Soviet Union to promote world peace, possibly continuing on around the world and returning via the Pacific Ocean. The Cold War, however, was still ongoing and despite many efforts over several years to promote her idea, obtaining permission from the Soviet Union proved insurmountable.

Planning the Grand Tour of the "Lower 48" 
The idea was to criss-cross the continental United States (the "Lower 48") in a single two-week period, landing at each state capital to promote her association's messages.
A retired USAF colonel, Frank E. Martineau, promoted this campaign and accompanied van Vliet. Martineau was an experienced pilot who had flown bombing missions during World War II and later flew for the U.S. Air Force Reserves. Now aged 69, he had logged 5,400 hours flying time with instrument flying experience. According to periodic newsletters her association published at the time, van Vliet, then 67 years old, believed his experience would significantly enhance her safety during the arduous and ambitious two-week flight.

Accident
Ultimately, after successfully landing in 47 states, the journey ended in tragedy just one mile short of the penultimate stop. On the morning of June 15, 1990, while executing an instrument approach to Yeager Airport, the single-engine Mooney M-20E that van Vliet and Martineau were flying from Columbus, Ohio to Charleston, West Virginia crashed into wooded terrain in light rain, turbulence and fog. Both perished in the crash.

According to the National Transportation Safety Board report issued in 1992, the probable cause of the crash was:

Postscript 
As another irony, the Soviet Union, by now undergoing perestroika, had finally approved van Vliet's request for the World Peace tour flight over their territory (with Martineau as copilot), just prior to the Grand Tour flight.

In 1991, van Vliet was honored by being inducted posthumously into the International Forest of Friendship in Atchison, Kansas.

References 

Charleston Daily Mail

 "Rally lifts teacher's hopes for her solo flight for peace", Adelle M. Banks, Journal-Bulletin Staff Writer. Providence Journal. Providence, R.I.: November 18, 1987. pg. C-11
 "Touring Warwick pilot dies in crash", Staff and wire reports. Providence Journal. Providence, R.I.: Jun 16, 1990. pg. A-03
 "Plane crash dead were experienced pilots", Charleston Gazette, June 16, 1990

1923 births
1990 deaths
American aviators
Aviators from Rhode Island
Aviators killed in aviation accidents or incidents in the United States
Accidental deaths in West Virginia
People from Warwick, Rhode Island
American women aviators
20th-century American women